Crowtown is an unincorporated community in Caldwell County, Kentucky, United States.

The community was named for the family of Crow settlers.

References

Unincorporated communities in Caldwell County, Kentucky
Unincorporated communities in Kentucky